Carlos Alberto Sánchez Romero (born 13 February 1980) is a Mexican former footballer who played as a defender.

Career
Sánchez began playing football with the local Club América. He spent several seasons with San Luis F.C. before returning to América in 2008. On 12 August 2008 he suffered before beginning practice a major stroke caused by a blood clot. He was released from the hospital and his condition has improved; he has been moved to physical therapy—his football career is over.

References

External links

1980 births
Living people
Mexican footballers
Club América footballers
San Luis F.C. players
Association football central defenders